Captain Sir Edward Folmer Archdale, 3rd Baronet DSC (8 September 1921 – 31 July 2009) was a British baronet, Royal Navy officer, submariner during the Second World War and local politician in Northern Ireland.

Early life
Edward Folmer Archdale was born on 8 September 1921 to Royal Navy officer and later Vice Admiral Sir Nicholas Archdale, 2nd Baronet, Aide-de-Camp to King George V of the United Kingdom. His mother was from Denmark.

Nicknamed "Teddy", he joined the Royal Navy after attending Copthorne Primary School in Sussex. He was in the Rodney class of 1935 at Dartmouth Naval College. After graduation, he was promoted to midshipman and served into the start of the war.

War service
By May 1940, he was serving aboard  under Lieutenant Commander Brian Dean.

Operation Dynamo
HMS Sabre was conspicuous in the evacuation of British and French soldiers from the beaches of beaches at Malo-Les-Bains and the harbour mole during the Dunkirk evacuation. During nine days and nights of the evacuation, despite being damaged in an air attack, Sabre made ten round trips to Dunkirk. An example of her activity at this time:

In the early hours of 28 May, three ships boats from HMS Sabre picked up 100 men in two hours, from the beaches at Malo-Les-Bains to the east of the harbour mole. Then it was full speed to Dover with a turnaround of only 58 minutes, and the ship was back again at the Dunkirk harbour mole at 11.00am, where they loaded a further 800 men. Departing at 12.30pm, by now the ships weight had increased considerably, lowering her propeller draft. This meant because of the falling tide and a defective echo sounder, Lieutenant-Commander Dean had to slowly edge her passage through the shallows. She arrived back in Dover at 6.20pm. Refuelled, she was back to the Dunkirk mole at 10.30pm, the third trip of the day. This time, the ship stayed for only 35 minutes picking up another 500 troops.

Finally on Tuesday 4 June just after two in the afternoon the Admiralty announced the end of Operation Dynamo. All together an armada of over 860 ships including 39 destroyers had taken part in the evacuation of troops from the beaches and harbour. The Admiralty calculated the total British and Allied troops landed in England amounted to 338,226 troops rescued.

HMS Sabre had made more round trips than most and brought back to Dover a total of 5,765 soldiers – amongst the highest number for any individual ship. Lieutenant Commander Dean was awarded a Distinguished Service Order on 6 June. Archdale, Sabre'''s midshipman, was mentioned in despatches.
 
Operation Aerial
After Dunkirk there were still Allied forces to be evacuated from other French ports along the coast westward so the navy had further work to do. 'Operation Cycle' launched on 10 June rescued some 11,000 from the Channel port of Le Havre. Then on the 12th HMS Sabre was deployed to help with the evacuation of still more British and Allied forces in 'Operation Aerial' from the rest of France. It began with the evacuation of Cherbourg and continued for the next ten days, moving south to St Nazaire, Bordeaux, and right down to the Franco-Spanish border. Sabre was sent to Alderney the northerly island amongst the Channel Islands on 23 June and helped evacuate around 1,400 islanders to safety in Weymouth.

Rescuing children from SS Volendam
In September 1940 Archdale was with HMS Sabre, detailed to meet the first slow Atlantic convoy, as it approached the United Kingdom from Canada. A Finnish merchant ship, Elle 3,868 tons was torpedoed at 04.25hrs on the 28th and Sabre joined the hunt for the German U-boat (U-101) without success. Then two days later, during the evening of 30 August off Malin Head Sabre helped rescue the survivors of a torpedoed (by German submarine U-60) Dutch ship the 15,000 tons Holland America line, SS Volendam. She was in an outward bound convoy OB-205 for Canada, carrying 600 passengers, including 321 children under the Children's Overseas Reception Board scheme some as young as five, together with a crew of 250. They were taken to various west coast ports in Scotland. In January 1941 Dean was badly injured in heavy seas and Sabre'' put into Larne, Northern Ireland. Lieutenant Peter Gretton took command from 11 January 1941.

He served from 1942 to 1943 aboard  under Alistair Mars, where he served as gunnery officer. He was awarded the Distinguished Service Cross in October 1943.

Post-war service
After submarine service, he taught at the stone frigate  as a gunnery instructor. He retired from the Royal Navy and worked in defence sales after retirement.

Political career
After he retired from the Ministry of Defence, Sir Edward became involved in local politics in Northern Ireland. He often wrote to newspapers about Naval policy. He was a Conservative Party member until joining the United Kingdom Independence Party later in life.

Arms

References 
The Miracle of Dunkirk, (1998), Walter Lord, Wordsworth military Library, 
The Gourock Times of 6 September 1940: Newspaper Article about the torpedoing of SS Volendam,

External links
"HMS Unbroken (P 42)". 
Obituary in The Telegraph
Royal Navy (RN) Officers 1939–1945

1921 births
2009 deaths
Baronets in the Baronetage of the United Kingdom
Military personnel from Portsmouth
Recipients of the Distinguished Service Cross (United Kingdom)
Royal Navy officers of World War II
Royal Navy submariners
English people of Danish descent